The Tempest is a series of adventures published by Lion Rampant in 1990 for the fantasy role-playing game Ars Magica.

Description
The Tempest is an adventure divided into series of four scenarios involving a druid who survived a mighty magical battle and now seeks revenge against the players' covenant. Although the separate scenarios may seem unrelated at first, gradually the overall storyline is revealed.

Publication history
Ars Magica was first published by Lion Rampant in 1987. The Tempest was published three years later, a 64-page softcover book written by Stewart Wieck, with interior art by Eric Hotz and Charles Dougherty, and cover art by Jeff Menges.

Reception
In the June 1991 edition of Dragon (Issue #170), Ken Rolston was impressed by this book's "fine problem-solving and moral challenges." He concluded with a strong recommendation, saying, "The story and theme are appealing, and the scenarios present many opportunities for rich role-playing and engaging GM performances."

Other reviews
White Wolf #25 (Feb./March, 1991)

References

Ars Magica adventures
Role-playing game supplements introduced in 1990